Steenkerque (in older English references also Steenkerke, Steenkirk, Steinkerque, Steinkerke or Steinkirk) is a village of  Wallonia and a district of the municipality of Braine-le-Comte, located in Hainaut Province, Belgium,  south-west of Brussels and  south of Enghien. 

Steenkerque is notable for the Battle of Steenkerque in 1692 during the Nine Years' War, when France defeated a joint English-Scottish-Dutch-German army.

The French movie The African Doctor (in French Bienvenue à Marly-Gomont) was shot in this village in 2015.

External links
 

Former municipalities of Hainaut (province)